1 South African Corps was a large military formation composed of two SADF Divisions.

History

Requirement to consolidate leadership of the Citizen Force
An Active Citizen Force headquarters was established in April 1965. 
This Active Citizen Force headquarters changed its name to HQ Army Task Force (Permanent Force) in 1967. 
This Task Force managed 1 South African Corps which then was subdivided into 7th South African Infantry Division
and 8th South African Armoured Division.

Breakdown late 70s
A provisional 1977 order of battle had 1 South African Corps organised as follows:

Artillery
Field Artillery
14 Light Regiment, 
15 Missile Regiment,
Light Anti-aircraft
47 Anti-aircraft Regiment, 
57 Anti-aircraft Regiment, 
67 Anti-aircraft C&R Unit,
Engineers
17 Field Squadron, 
27 Engineer Support Regiment,
Infantry
1 Para,
1 Para,
Signals
Corps Signals Group
Maintenance
13 Maintenance Unit
23 Maintenance Unit
33 Maintenance Unit
15 Transit Maintenance Unit
201 Air Supply Company
27 Field Workshop, 
37 Field Workshop, 
11 Medium Workshop, 
12 Medium Workshop, 
Medical
23 Mobile Hospital,
48 Field Ambulance Unit,
10 Medical Evacuation Unit,
26 Field Hygiene Company,
Military Police
11 Provost Company, 
12 Provost Company, 
Paymaster
17 Field Pay Unit

Closure
1 SA Corps was disbanded in the early to mid-1980s. The two Divisions were at that stage, well established and would report directly to HQ Army Task Force.

Notes

References

Army units and formations of South Africa
Disbanded military units and formations in Pretoria
Military units and formations established in 1965
Military units and formations disestablished in 1985